Howze is a surname. Notable people with the surname include:

Hamilton H. Howze (1908–1998), American general, son of Robert
Joseph Lawson Howze (1923–2019), American Roman Catholic bishop
Lisa Howze (born 1973), American politician
Robert Lee Howze (1864–1926), American general